Blossom Valley is a neighborhood of San Jose, California, located in South San Jose.

Geography
Blossom Valley is located in South San Jose. It is northeast of Almaden Valley, northwest of Santa Teresa, east of Cambrian, west of Edenvale, and south of Communications Hill.

Blossom Valley lies within the 95123 and 95136 zip codes.

Economy
The Westfield Oakridge Mall provides major department and specialty stores to Blossom Valley.

Education
Schools in Blossom Valley include:
Communitas Charter High School
Gunderson High School
Oak Grove High School.

External links 
 Blossom Valley Neighborhood Association
 VEP Community Association

Neighborhoods in San Jose, California